A Nearly Decent Girl is a 1963 West German-Spanish comedy film directed by Ladislao Vajda and starring Liselotte Pulver, Alberto de Mendoza and Martin Held.

Synopsis
The secretary of a German factory manager accompanies him on a business trip to Madrid where she falls in love with a local man.

Partial cast
 Liselotte Pulver as Lili Steiner
 Alberto de Mendoza as Carlos García-Manzanares y Soler
 Martin Held as Robert Steckler
 Manolo Morán as Álvarez
 Juanjo Menéndez as José
 Miguel Gila as Rodríguez
 Mariano Azaña as Manolo
 Venancio Muro as José 'Pepe' de la Vega
 Alicia Altabella as Rosita
 María Cabo as Marisa
 Goyo Lebrero as Guía Madrid by Night
 Cris Huerta as Kronlick
 Ana María Custodio as Madre de Carlos (as Ana Mª Custodio)
 Xan das Bolas as Propietario bar
 Pedro Rodríguez de Quevedoa s Recepcionista hotel
 Carmen Rodríguez as Abuela de Carlos
 Juan Cazalilla as Dependiente tienda confección
 Manuel Arbó as Primer hombre en pagar corbata
 Ángel Álvarez as Guía Don Quijote

References

Bibliography 
 Bock, Hans-Michael & Bergfelder, Tim. The Concise CineGraph. Encyclopedia of German Cinema. Berghahn Books, 2009.

External links 
 

1963 films
1963 comedy films
German comedy films
Spanish comedy films
West German films
1960s German-language films
Films shot in Spain
Films directed by Ladislao Vajda
Bavaria Film films
1960s German films